The Parkshore is a 556 ft (169m) tall skyscraper in Chicago, Illinois. It was completed in 1991 and has 56 floors. Barancik Conte designed the building, which is the 53rd tallest in Chicago. The pool on the 56th floor is the highest outdoor pool in Chicago.

Position in Chicago's skyline

See also
List of tallest buildings in Chicago

References

Residential skyscrapers in Chicago
Residential buildings completed in 1991
Residential condominiums in Chicago
1991 establishments in Illinois
New Eastside
Lakeshore East